Zubeda Dakhtarullah is a Pakistani politician who is the member of the Provincial Assembly of Balochistan.

Political career
Dakhtarullah was elected to the Provincial Assembly of Balochistan as a candidate of Muttahida Majlis-e-Amal (MMA) on a reserved seat for women in consequence of 2018 Pakistani general election. She assumed the membership of the assembly on 13 August 2018.

References

Living people
Muttahida Majlis-e-Amal politicians
Politicians from Balochistan, Pakistan
Year of birth missing (living people)